Cycas multipinnata (or Epicycas multipinnata) is a species of cycad (faily Cycadaceae) in southwestern China and northern Vietnam. It is noteworthy for three things: First it is one of the tuberous species which some taxonomists segregate as the genus Epicycas. Cultivated plants have had petioles as long as thirteen feet (four meters). The total length of the bipinnate frond can be up to 23 feet seven meters) The ultimate pinnules are "Y" shaped. Thirdly, this very conspicuous plant escaped notice until 1994. Among Gymnosperms, these fronds are exceeded in mass only by Encephalartos laurentianus.

Distribution
Cycas multipinnata is found in:
Red River gorge in eastern Yunnan
Honghe Nature Cycad Reserve, Yunnan
Xilong Mountain Natural Reserve, Yunnan
western Guangxi, China
Yen Bai Province, northern Vietnam

It likely occurs in Honghe, Jianshui, Mengla, and Mile counties of Yunnan.

References

multipinnata